Xishuangbanna, Sibsongbanna or Sipsong Panna (Tham: , New Tai Lü script: ; ; ; ;), shortened to Banna, is an autonomous prefecture for Dai people in the extreme south of Yunnan Province, China, bordering both Myanmar and Laos. The prefectural seat is Jinghong, the largest settlement in the area and one that straddles the Mekong, called the "Lancang River" in Chinese.

This region of China is noted for the distinct culture of its ethnic groups, one that is very different from that of the Han Chinese. The people, architecture, language and culture more closely resemble those of the Shan, Dai and Tai peoples, which includes the Thai and Lao.

Etymology
Sipsongpanna (cognate to the Thai) is a Tai Lü compound consisting of sipsong "twelve", pan "township" and na "rice paddy". The name refers to the traditional division of the mueang into twelve districts that were called panna (literally "township rice-fields") The etymology is parallel to the autonomous Tai-speaking region in French Indochina from 1890 to 1945 called Sip Song Chau Tai meaning "twelve Tai cantons".

History

Before 1886, the region was called Chiang Hung, a Tai Lue Kingdom contended between Lanna and the Burmese dynasties. British occupied the whole Burma in 1886, it became a part of British India. In 1892, the British transferred Chiang Hung to the Qing Dynasty. In the 19th century, it briefly became a tributary state of Luang Prabang and the Rattanakosin dynasty. Chiang Hung Kingdom submitted to the Qing dynasty during the late 19th century.

In the chaos of the Xinhai Revolution that overthrew the Qing government in 1911 in favor of a Chinese republican government, a local leader, the Chao Maha of Meng Jie, staged a rebellion against Qing remnant officials. The Yunnan provincial government of the newly established Republic of China sent troops in 1913 to oust the Chao Meng Jie rebels. Ke Shuxun remained in Xishuangbanna to govern with his "13 Principles of Governing the Frontier", which emphasized equality between Han and Dai in areas such as land ownership and taxation, allowed intermarriage between the ethnic groups and promoted education in secular and technical subjects, rather than Burmese-based monastic education. The Second Sino-Japanese War (1931-1945) saw the heavy bombardment of Xishuangbanna by Japanese troops and a simultaneous influx of Pan-Taiist propaganda from Japan's ally, Thailand. According to Hsieh, this reduced the appeal of a broad pan-Tai identity among the Dai Lue.

During the final phase of the Chinese Civil War, many remnants of the Kuomintang fled from Communists forces into Burma's Shan State from Xishuangbanna. The new People's Republic of China sent various non-military expeditions to Xishuangbanna from 1949 to provide services such as schools and hospitals to replace those from Christian western missionaries.

The Communists took control of the prefecture from Kuomintang loyalists in 1952. On January 23, 1953, the PRC established the Xishuangbanna Dai Autonomous Region and ended the native-chieftain system. That year, the People's Congress of Xishuangbanna created the New Tai Lue alphabet, based on the Tai Tham alphabet, for printing material in the Tai Lü language.

Xishuangbanna was made an autonomous prefecture in 1955 but lost some territory on the creation of Jingdong Yi Autonomous County and Jiangcheng Hani and Yi Autonomous County. Land reform started in earnest in January 1956, destroying the power of the village headmen. State-owned rubber plantations accounted for most of the region's wealth during the early PRC period.

Xishuangbanna also received an influx of educated youth during the Down to the Countryside Movement of the Cultural Revolution (1966-1976).  During this period Buddhist temples in Xishuangbanna were used as barns, only being restored to their original purpose in 1981.

In 1987, the Xishuangbanna government promulgated the Law of the Xishuangbanna Dai Nationality Autonomous Prefecture for Self-government to bring local laws into line with the national Law of the People's Republic of China for Regional National Autonomy.

Shao Cunxin (1922–2015), former head of the Chieftain's outer council (1944–1950) and chief of Meng Peng (1938–1950), was the chief of the autonomous prefecture from 1955 to 1992.

Administrative subdivisions

Xishuangbanna governs one county-level city and two counties.

 references:Xishuangbanna Gov, Citypopulation.de Yunnan Urban Populations.

Geography
Xishuangbanna is the home of the Dai people. The region sits at a lower altitude than most of Yunnan, and borders closely on tropical climate.

Biodiversity

Xishuangbanna harbors much of the biodiversity of Yunnan, which harbors much of the biodiversity of China.  Its tropical climate and its remoteness until recent times account for this.  In addition to an abundance of plants, Xishuangbanna is home to the last few Asian elephants still in China; the species roamed over a large part of the country even as late as a few hundred years ago.  The elephants are protected in a reserve, but the plant diversity is threatened by, and has for five decades been threatened by, the proliferation of natural rubber plantations which completely destroy the rainforest and replace it with a monoculture of trees originally from Brazil.

Passiflora xishuangbannaensis is a recently discovered passiflora species that is endemic to Xishuangbanna.

Demographics 
The 2000 national census documented that Xishuangbanna had 993,397 inhabitants with a population density of 50.43 inhabitants per km2. According to the 2000 national census, Dai people make up the plurality at 29.89%, with the Han Chinese coming in at a close second at 29.11%. At the time of the 1977 census, however, Han people made up the largest single ethnic group in Xishuangbanna, making up 36.53% of a population of 627,089, while Dai made up 33.15%, and others 30.32%. The Xishuangbanna government has strived to maintain this ethnic balance of around 33% of each group: Han, Dai, and other; this policy is known as "the plan of three-three-three"

Before the increasing social mobility of the 1940s, inhabitants of Xishuangbanna called each other "basin people" or "mountain people" in reference to the groups' stereotyped location. The Han and Dai lived mostly around the mountains and played a socially dominant role, while the non-Dai ethnic minorities lived in the basins and were politically disenfranchised. The Dai used to be called the Baiyi, and until a 1936 Kuomintang reform, the bai part was written with the dog radical. The PRC government decided that regardless of radical, the term Baiyi is pejorative, and adopted Dai instead. Historically, some ethnic minorities adapted some Dai characteristics in order to alleviate discrimination and increase their social status, such as the Blang people adopting the sarong, practicing matrilocal residence, and learning the Tai Tham alphabet.

Ethnic groups

Ethnic groups in Xishuangbanna, 2000 census

In Jinghong City and Menghai County, the two major Hani subgroups are Jiuwei 鸠为 and Jizuo 吉坐. The Jizuo 吉坐 are the largest Hani ethnic subgroup in Jinghong.

The Jiuwei claim to have migrated from Honghe and Mojiang. The Jiuwei live in various villages in Jinghong, including:
Mengbozhai 勐波寨, Menghan Town 勐罕寨, Jinghong City
Agupu 阿古普 (also called Manwoke 曼窝科) in Leiwu 类吴, Mengsong Township 勐宋, Jinghong City
Napazhai 那帕寨 in Damenglong 大勐笼, Jinghong City
Baiya village 拜牙村 in Menghun 勐混, Menghai County (The Ake 阿克 subgroup lives in Lougu 楼固村, located in Menghun 勐混 as well.)
Babingzhai 坝丙寨, Xidingshan 西定山, Menghai County

There are also ethnic Hani that are locally called Aini 爱尼 living in 7 villages on Nanlin Mountain 南林山 of southwestern Jinghong, namely Manbage 曼八阁, Manjinglong 曼景龙, Manjingnan 曼景囡, Mangudu 曼固独, Manbaqi 曼把奇, Manbasan 曼巴伞, and Manjingmai 曼景卖.

Culture 

The Six famous tea mountains region located in the prefecture produce some of the most highly regarded Pu-erh tea in the 20th century.

Xishuangbanna is rich in nature, historical and cultural resources, noted for its folklore, rain forests, rare plants, and wildlife. Its major tourist attractions include Menglun Tropical Botanical Garden, Manfeilong Pagodas (Tanuozhuanglong), Jingzhen Pavilion, Wild Elephant Gully, Dai people's village at Ganlanba.  The Manchunman Buddhist Temple, which has a history of more than 1400 years, is also a very popular tourist attraction. The complex is made up of four parts, the main hall, the sutra collection pavilion, the gold pagoda, and the drum tower. The temple is well known within the Southeast Asian region and each year attracts Buddhist monks and visitors from Sri Lanka, Thailand, Myanmar and Laos.

The well-known traditional festival is the Dai New Year, known as the Water-Splashing Festival. It lasts for three days from April 13 to 15. Besides the water festival event it also consists of some other events such as Dragon boat races, the firing of indigenous missiles, flying Kongming Lamps.

Transport

Since the opening of the Xishuangbanna Gasa Airport (formerlyJinghong International Airpor) in 1990, traveling to Xishuangbanna by air has become more popular and convenient and there are daily flights connecting Xishuangbanna with Kunming City. The area also has air connections with Dali, Chengdu and Bangkok.

There are also bus routes to places all over Yunnan and neighboring provinces.
It is 590 kilometers from Kunming to Jinghong. Long-distances buses depart from Kunming South Station and arrive at Jinghong Bus Station, costing CNY 210–250, which is about 8–10 hours duration.

In October 2010, plans were announced for a  railway linking Xishuangbanna to Vientiane, Laos; connections to Thailand are also possible.

See also

 Sip Song Chau Tai
 Xishuangbanna Tropical Botanical Garden

References

Literature

External links

Xishuangbanna Prefecture government website
Xishuangbanna-Jinghong city government website
Xishuangbanna-Mengbalanaxi
Xishuangbanna Daily
Xishuangbanna travel information
Xishuangbanna Biodiversity Centre and Guide
Xishuangbanna Tropical Botanical Garden

 
Autonomous prefectures of the People's Republic of China
Biosphere reserves of China
Dai people
Tourism in Yunnan